Ahmed Bin Jaafar Bin Brahim Ibn Al Jazzar Al-Qayrawani (895–979), was an influential 10th-century Muslim Arab physician who became famous for his writings on Islamic medicine. He was born in Qayrawan in Tunisia. He was known in Europe by the Latinized name Algizar.

Biography 
We know the biography of Ibn Al Jazzar only by an Andalusian physician Ibn Juljul and he only knew it by his student Ibn Bariq, who went to Qayrawan, Tunisia to learn medicine. The writers of Tabakates or "classes of famous men" generally considered writing only for Faquih, the benefactors and the saints. The information we have about Ibn Al Jazzar are second hand, they are either incomplete, or controversial.

Ahmed Ben Jaafar Ben Brahim Ibn Al Jazzar was born in Qayrawan around 895, and died around 979. He lived for about 84 years. He was married, although he did not have children. He had learned the quran at kuttab in his youth, grammar, theology, fiqh and history at the mosque Okba Ibn Nafaa. He had learned medicine from his father and his uncle that were physicians, and from Ishaq Ibn Suleiman (Isaac Ben Salomon), a physician in Qayrawan.

The existence of a hospital in Kairouan is not proven. Teaching is provided by the doctors themselves at home. This is the case of Ibn Al Jazzar. He said himself in the conclusion of his book Zad Al Mussafir (Viaticum), he would be available at home for his students at the end of its daily consultation.

The teaching was oral. The paper was not widely spread in the ninth century, the scrolls were rare and expensive. Ibn Al Jazzar had a library rich of 25 quintals, as it seems. This figure seems exaggerated. The quintal at the time amounted to 50 kg according to some and 25 kg according to others. These books were not all about medicine, but also of other disciplines.

Ibn Al Jazzar was calm and quiet. He did not attend funerals or weddings, and did not take part in festivities. He had great respect for himself. He avoided compromises, did not attend the court and members of the regime, thus taking on Fouqaha example of the time. This may explain the fact that when he treated the son of Cadhi Al Nooman, he refused to receive as a gift a costume of 300 mithkals. It is also by respect of the Emir that he had not realized his desire to visit Andalusia, the relationship between the two governments of Mahdia and Cordoba were tense. It is also by respect for the Emir that he did not begin his pilgrimage to Mecca in spite of his strong desire to do so. The Emir was Shia and for ceremonial purposes and policies, he creates barriers to pilgrims and forced them to pass through Mahdia and pay a toll.

But he went every Friday to Mahdia to the uncle of the Emir El Moez Lidin Allah, which he was bound by friendship. During the heat of the summer, he went to Monastir and lived in a ribat with valiant soldiers who watched the boundaries. Ibn Al Jazzar preparing himself the medicines and had an assistant serve them who stood in the vestibule of the house, and who collected the fees of the consultations. We do not know the amount of a consultation or a visit at his home, but we know that at his death  Ibn Al Jazzar left 24,000 gold dinars. The Aghlabid dinar weighed 4.20 grams.

The Viaticum 
Ibn Al Jazzar wrote a number of books. They deal with grammar, history, jurisprudence, prosody, etc. Many of these books, quoted by different authors are lost. The most important book of Ibn Al Jazzar is Zad Al Mussafir (The Viaticum). Translated into Latin, Greek and Hebrew, it has been copied, recopied, and printed in France and Italy in the sixteenth century. It was adopted and popularized in Europe as a book for a classical education in medicine. This book is a compilation as the Canon of Avicenna, a mixture of medicine and philosophy. Avicenna was not a medical practitioner, but Ibn Al Jazzar was, and his book was useful.

It is a medicine handbook from head to toe, designed for clinical teaching. We find neither anatomy nor philosophy. There are lessons written after the course, as noted by the author in the conclusion of his book. This can be seen by the repetitions found in them. The author names the disease, lists the known symptoms, gives the treatment and sometime indicates the prognosis. He often cited in reference the names of foreign authors, as if to give importance to his subject, or for intellectual integrity to justify the loans.

As al-Razi Muhammad ibn Zakariya al-Razi, preceded him by a few decades and as Ibn Al Jazzar has adopted in the Viaticum the same style as "El Hawi" (The Continent: who voluntarily abstain from carnal pleasures) of al-Razi but more elaborate and more concise. Given this many postulate al-Razi’s works were introduced to him at a very young age. This is unlikely, because in The Viaticum he does not separate measles from smallpox, which was the innovation of al-Razi. And among the physicians whom he often refers such Galen, Hippocrates, Dioscorides, Refus, Tridon, Fergorius, Aristotle and Ibn Suleiman Isaac Israeli ben Solomon, he does not mention al-Razi. Books of these authors must have existed in Tunisia at that time. Tunisia was in constant contact with Rome, Athens and Byzantium by the sheer size of its economy, and the position of Tunisia in the midst of the Mediterranean Sea.

We can not speak of Ibn Al Jazzar without mentioning the translator of his books: Constantine the African.

Books 
His major work was Zād al-Musāfir.

He also had some books on geriatric medicine and health of elderly (Kitāb Ṭibb al-Mashāyikh) or (Ṭibb al-Mashāyikh wa-ḥifẓ ṣiḥḥatihim). Also a book on sleep disorders and  another one on forgetfulness and how to strengthen memory (Kitāb al-Nisyān wa-Ṭuruq Taqwiyat al-Dhākira) and a Treatise on causes of mortality (Risāla fī Asbāb al-Wafāh).

Also he had other books on pediatrics, fevers, sexual disorders, medicine of the poor, therapeutics, vaticum, coryza, stomach disorders, leprosy, separate drugs, compound drugs, and this is in addition to his books in other areas of science, e.g., history, animals and literature.

See also 
List of Arab scientists and scholars

References

Bibliography 
Ahmed Ben Miled, Ibn Al Jazzar. Constantin l'Africain, éd. Salambô, Tunis, 1987
Ahmed Ben Miled, Histoire de la médecine arabe en Tunisie, éd. Dar al-Gharb al-Islami, Beyrouth, 1999
Ahmed Ben Miled, Ibn Al Jazzar. Médecin à Kairouan, éd. Al Maktaba Al Tounisia, Tunis, 1936

External links 
 Ibn al-Jazzār

People from Kairouan
890s births
970s deaths
10th-century physicians
Physicians of the medieval Islamic world
10th-century people of Ifriqiya
Scholars from the Fatimid Caliphate